The Sechelt or Shíshálh people, (in their language spelled Shishá7lh) are an indigenous people of the Pacific Northwest Coast. At the time of the first European contact the Sechelt had a population of close to 26,000. Sechelt women were famous for their beautiful cedar woven baskets, which were made using materials such as cedar tree roots, cannery grass and birch bark.

The Sechelt First Nations settlement included four villages in the area now called British Columbia, on the Sunshine Coast, two in Jervis Inlet, and one each on Pender Harbour and on Sechelt Inlet. As the Europeans settled in the region, the Sechelt people experienced numerous changes. Disease brought over by the Europeans (especially smallpox) became rampant, and resulted in a severe decrease of the Sechelt population at their various traditional settlements.

The language of the Sechelt is called sháshíshálh. "Shashishalhem" is considered the most practical English spelling of this word. Sháshíshálh is part of the Coast Salish language group. As of 2014, the Coastal Corridor Consortium, "an entity made up of board members from First Nations and educational partners to improve aboriginal access to and performance in postsecondary education and training" has created a Sechelt Nation language certificate.

The heritage of the nation is shown in the tems swiya Museum in Sechelt, which opened in 1994 on the site of the former St. Augustine's Indian Residential School.

Notes

References
 Sechelt Indian Band/shíshálh first nation
 

 
Sunshine Coast (British Columbia)